Wayland Academy (formerly Wayland Community High School) is a small mixed secondary school located in Watton in the English county of Norfolk. It is part of the Inspiration Trust being refactored from the Transforming Education in NorfolkTrust group of schools in January 2020.

History
The school was converted to academy status in August 2012, and was previously a community school under the direct control of Norfolk County Council. The school continues to coordinate with Norfolk County Council for admissions.

Academics
The schools offers GCSEs and BTECs as programmes of study, with some courses offered in conjunction with Easton & Otley College and City College Norwich.

Notable former pupils

Wayland Community High School
Shaun Bailey, cricketer
Caroline Flack, television presenter

References

External links

Secondary schools in Norfolk
Academies in Norfolk
Watton, Norfolk